KCCC (930 AM) is a radio station broadcasting a classic country music format. Licensed to Carlsbad, New Mexico, United States, the station is currently owned by Jonathan Chandler, through licensee Chandler Broadcasting Llc.

References

External links

FCC History Cards for KCCC

CCC
Radio stations established in 1967
1967 establishments in New Mexico
Classic country radio stations in the United States